"You Are Not I" is a short story by Paul Bowles written in 1948 and first published in the January 1948 issue of Mademoiselle magazine. It later appeared in the collection of his short fiction, The Delicate Prey and Other Stories (1950), published by Random House.

The story is one Bowles's tale of "transference", in which the madwoman who narrates the story believes she has occupied the body and mind of her sane sister.

Plot
"You Are Not I"  is told in the first-person, by a narrator identified as Ethel.

The story opens minutes after a catastrophic train derailment. The disaster has occurred within sight of a mental institute. In the confusion, Ethel, an inmate of the asylum, walks off the gated property without being detected by the staff. She wanders about the wreckage, observing the dead and injured passengers thrown from the carriages, but with utter detachment. A number of corpses have been assembled in a row. Ethyl collects small, smooth stones from the embankment, and compulsively inserts one into each of the mouths of the dead. When she attempts to remove jewelry from the hand of a woman buried in the wreckage, she is accosted by a train employee. Weeping, Ethyl claims that the woman is her dead sister. She is led to an assembly area for survivors. She is assumed to be suffering from shock after an examination at the local hospital.

She tells the authorities the address of her sister who lives nearby, and is driven there. When she arrives, her sister greets her arrival with dismay. Unlike the medics, she knows that Ethyl was never on the train and suffers from severe mental illness, not shock. She objects to having Ethyl in her household.  She calls the asylum and arranges to have Ethyl recommitted. Ethyl has become obsessed that she has assumed the body and mind of her "dead" sister. When she arrives at the institution, she writes the narrative that constitutes the story, believing that she now occupies her sister's home, and that she has exchanged existences with her sibling. Ethyl believes her sister is now confirmed in  the mental ward and "I am still in my living room, sitting on the divan."

Publication history
In a 1974 interview with Lawrence Stewart, Bowles explained that the concept for "You Are Not I" arose from a dream. He rose in the night and sketched the outline, as well as a number of details,  on a notepad in the dark.

Style
Bowles's first-person narrative, "an exploration of a neurotic human consciousness" is delivered by an inmate of a mental institution. On the similarity of this story to the works of Edgar Allan Poe, Bowles biographer Allen Hibbard writes:

Film adaptation

In 1981, a film adaptation of the same name was directed by Sara Driver in her directorial debut, It is a short subject film based on Bowles's story and co-written by Jim Jarmusch. Shot in six days on a $12,000 budget, it developed a following soon after a well-received premiere at the Public Theater, only to be pulled out of circulation when a warehouse fire destroyed the film's negative. Rarely seen, it was still championed by renowned critics and film journals like Jonathan Rosenbaum and Cahiers du Cinéma, which hailed You Are Not I as one of the best films of the 1980s. Considered 'lost' for many years, a print was later discovered among Bowles's belongings. Driver was awarded a preservation grant from Women in Film and Television. The restored film screened in the Master Works section of the 2011 New York Film Festival.

References

Sources 
Hibbard, Allen. 1993. Paul Bowles: A Study of the Short Fiction. Twayne Publishers. New York. 
Prose, Francine. 2002. The Coldest Eye: acting badly among the Arabs. Harper's Magazine. March 2002. https://harpers.org/archive/2002/03/the-coldest-eye/  Retrieved July 10, 2022.
Tóibín, Colm. 2007. Avoid the Orient. Review, Paul Bowles: A Life, by Virginia Spencer Carr. London Review of Books,  Vol. 29 No. 1, January 4, 2007. https://www.lrb.co.uk/the-paper/v29/n01/colm-toibin/avoid-the-orient Retrieved July 11, 2022.
Vidal, Gore. 1979. Introduction to Paul Bowles; Collected Stories, 1939-1976. Black Sparrow Press. Santa Rosa. 2001. 

1948 short stories
American short stories
Short stories by Paul Bowles
Short stories adapted into films
Works originally published in Mademoiselle (magazine)
First-person narrative fiction